Cylindrepomus viridipennis is a species of beetle in the family Cerambycidae. It was described by Pic in 1937. It is known from Thailand, Vietnam and Laos.

References

Dorcaschematini
Beetles described in 1937